Nahunta is a city in Brantley County, Georgia, United States. It is the county seat of Brantley County. It is part of the Brunswick, Georgia Metropolitan Statistical Area. The population was 1,053 at the 2010 census. The city is an important crossroad which is intersected by U.S. Route 82 and U.S. Route 301 in its downtown area.

History

Nahunta, originally called Victoria, was founded about 1870. It is believed that the town was renamed in 1899 for timber executive N.A. Hunter, but the origin of the name has never been officially verified. In 1923, the seat of Brantley County was transferred to Nahunta from Hoboken.

The Georgia General Assembly incorporated Nahunta as a city in 1925.

In the late 1970s and early 1980s, Nahunta gained national attention for its armadillo festival during the first weekend in May, that included the "Brantley County Armadillo Olympics" and "a cookout with armadillo prominently featured on the menu".

Geography
Nahunta is located at  (31.204527, -81.982285).

Climate

According to the Köppen Climate Classification system, Nahunta has a humid subtropical climate, abbreviated "Cfa" on climate maps.

Demographics

2020 census

As of the 2020 United States census, there were 1,013 people, 332 households, and 189 families residing in the city.

2010 census
As of the 2010 United States Census, there were 1,053 people living in the city. The racial makeup of the city was 78.8% White, 17.2% Black, 0.1% from some other race and 1.8% from two or more races. 2.1% were Hispanic or Latino of any race.

2000 census
As of the census of 2000, there were 930 people, 375 households, and 253 families living in the city. The racial makeup of the city was 74.30% White, 24.30% African American, 0.11% Native American, 0.32% Asian, and 0.97% from two or more races. Hispanic or Latino people of any race were 0.97% of the population.

There were 375 households, out of which 30.9% had children under the age of 18 living with them, 44.0% were married couples living together, 18.7% had a female householder with no husband present, and 32.3% were non-families. 28.8% of all households were made up of individuals, and 11.5% had someone living alone who was 65 years of age or older. The average household size was 2.44 and the average family size was 2.92.

In the city, the population was spread out, with 27.3% under the age of 18, 8.4% from 18 to 24, 26.6% from 25 to 44, 25.6% from 45 to 64, and 12.2% who were 65 years of age or older. The median age was 36 years. For every 100 females, there were 91.8 males. For every 100 females age 18 and over, there were 86.7 males.

The median income for a household in the city was $25,368, and the median income for a family was $29,792. Males had a median income of $26,184 versus $21,083 for females. The per capita income for the city was $12,790. About 22.0% of families and 30.1% of the population were below the poverty line, including 42.9% of those under age 18 and 19.3% of those age 65 or over.

Education

Brantley County School District 
Brantley County students in grades Kindergarten to grade twelve are in the Brantley County School District, which consists of six elementary schools, a middle school, and a high school. The district has 196 full-time teachers and over 3,332 students.

Atkinson Elementary School
Hoboken Elementary School
Nahunta Elementary School
Nahunta Primary School
Waynesville Primary School
Brantley County Middle School
Brantley County High School

See also
 Brantley County Courthouse
 Nahunta Subdivision

References

Cities in Georgia (U.S. state)
Cities in Brantley County, Georgia
County seats in Georgia (U.S. state)
Brunswick metropolitan area